Enn Kippel (until 1935 Eduard Ferdinand Kippel; 16 February 1901 Tallinn – 15 February 1942 Leningrad) was an Estonian writer.

After 1935, he studied some time at University of Tartu, taking courses related to theology. From 1936, he was a member of Estonian Writers' Union. He was also a member of left-wing student society . In 1941, he joined to Communist Party of the Soviet Union. During World War II, he was a front correspondent. He died in 1942 during the Siege of Leningrad.

Selected works
 1935: two-part novel "Ahnitsejad" ('The Greedy')
 1939: novel "Kuldvasikas" ('Golden Calf')
 1941: novel "Meelis"

References

1901 births
1942 deaths
Estonian male novelists
Estonian journalists
20th-century Estonian novelists
Estonian editors
University of Tartu alumni
Writers from Tallinn
People from Tallinn
Victims of the Siege of Leningrad